The Unfinished Comedy (Méiyǒu wánchéng de xǐjù) is a 1957 Chinese film directed by Lü Ban. This notorious satirical comedy has been described as "perhaps the most accomplished [Chinese] film made in the 17 years between 1949 and the Cultural Revolution". Due to its controversial subject matter, the movie was received very poorly by the censor critics and not shown to a wider public, and led to Lü Ban's ban from future film making until his death two decades later.

Plot
Two comedians perform a series of sketches in a theatre for a group of Communist Party officials, including a critic censor.

Cast
Cast members include:
Han Langen, as comedian 1
Yin Xiucen, as comedian 2
Fang Hua as Comrade Yi Bangzi, the censor/critic
Su Manyi (苏曼意)
Chen Zhong		
Ning Jiapin
Wen Hua

Production 
The movie was directed by Lü Ban of the Changchun Film Studio during the period of lessened censorship in 1956–57 (known as the Hundred Flowers Campaign).

Reception
During the Anti-Rightist Movement, a backlash against the liberal Hundred Flowers Campaigns, the movie was subject to harsh criticism. The movie has been widely criticized for Chinese censors for excessive slapstick and "taking the satirical license too far". The movie subject matter was too controversial for its time, as it touched upon a sensitive topic of film censorship and its portrayal of the "humorless party official", a film censor nicknamed "The Bludgeon", and the main object of ridicule in the film, has been described as unflattering. The censor is alleged to be blind, uninterested in either watching or discussing the movie, yet drunk on his power related to deciding whether the movie will be allowed to be screened or not. Its criticism of the censor official was interpreted as too close to the criticism of the Communist Party itself, as after all it was the Party that argued for the necessity of censorship. It headed the list of problematic movies, the so-called "poisonous weeds" list, and was banned before its release. Chen Huangmei, an important Party official described as "film czar", lambasted the movie in an editorial in People's Daily, as "thoroughly anti-Party, antisocialist, and tasteless". The movie and Lü Ban became subject to a number of highly critical articles in Chinese press.

The Unfinished Comedy ended Lü Ban's career as shortly afterward, Lü Ban himself was banned from directing for life and sentenced to internal exile; he had to abandon work on film-making, leaving behind several unfinished projects, and died in 1976 without being allowed to work on another film.

The disastrous reception of the movie by the film censors was one of the reasons for other Chinese film makers putting more effort into self-censorship and abandoning the genre of satirical comedy (the next one would not appear in Chinese theaters until mid-80s); for years to come, the dominant model of comedy in China became one that avoided conflict, and presented safe stories involving model socialist citizens learning how to better live in the harmonious socialist society.

The reception of the movie abroad has been significantly better. Paul Clark in his book on Chinese Cinema described it as "perhaps the most accomplished [Chinese] film made in the 17 years between 1949 and the Cultural Revolution".

References

External links

The Unfinished Comedy from the Chinese Movie Database

Chinese comedy films
1957 films
1950s Mandarin-language films
Chinese black-and-white films
Censored films
1957 comedy films
Film censorship in China
Film controversies in China
Works banned in China